Yui may refer to:

People
Yui (name), a Japanese name
Yui (singer) (born 1987), Japanese singer-songwriter, multi-instrumentalist, and actress
Yui people or Ibi, a Timucuan-speaking people in what now is Georgia, United States

Places
Yui, Shizuoka, a former town located in Shizuoka, Japan
Yui Station, a railway station on the Tōkaidō Main Line in Shizuoka

Other
YUI Library, an open-source JavaScript and CSS library
Corrector Yui, a 1999 magical girl series
Yui Rail, an alternate name for the Okinawa Urban Monorail